Matthewstown Halt railway station served the community of Ynysboeth, in the historical county of Glamorgan, Wales, from 1914 to 1964 on the Aberdare line.

History 
The station was opened as Matthewstown Platform on 1 October 1914 by the Taff Vale
Railway. Its name was changed to Matthewstown Halt on 2 October 1922. It closed on 16 March 1964.

References 

Disused railway stations in Rhondda Cynon Taf
Railway stations in Great Britain opened in 1910
Railway stations in Great Britain closed in 1964
1910 establishments in Wales
1964 disestablishments in Wales